Working Girl is a 1988 American film.

Working Girl(s) or The Working Girl(s) may also refer to:

 Prostitute
 Women in the workforce

Film and television

Films
 Working Girl (2015 film), or Casa Amor: Exclusive for Ladies, a South Korean film
 Working Girls (1931 film), an American film directed by Dorothy Arzner
 Working Girls, a 1984 Filipino film directed by Ishmael Bernal
Working Girls 2, a 1987 Filipino film directed by Ishmael Bernal
 Working Girls (1986 film), an American film by Lizzie Borden
 Working Girls (2010 film), a Filipino remake of the 1984 film
 Working Girls (2020 film), a Belgian film directed by Frédéric Fonteyne and Anne Paulicevich
 The Working Girls, a 1974 American sexploitation film by Stephanie Rothman

Television
 Working Girl (TV series), a 1990 American sitcom adapted from the 1988 film
 Katherine Lynch's Working Girls, a 2008 Irish comedy series starring Katherine Lynch

Episodes
 "Working Girl" (Black-ish)
 "Working Girl" (Full House)
 "Working Girls" (Broad City)
 "Working Girls" (Game On)

Music
Working Girl (album), by Little Boots, 2015
 Working Girl (Original Soundtrack Album), from the 1988 film, 1989
 "Working Girl", a song by Dolly Parton from 9 to 5 and Odd Jobs, 1980
 "Working Girl", a song by the Members from Uprhythm, Downbeat, 1982
 "Working Girl", a song by Train from A Girl, a Bottle, a Boat, 2017
 "Working Girls", a song by Redgum from Cut to the Quick, 1982